William of Coventry (called Claudius Conversus) was an English Carmelite friar and historian. He wrote on the history of Carmelites and other subjects.

Works 
William was born at Coventry, and became a Carmelite. He must have been a lay brother of the order there, since if he was lame, as the name Claudius indicates, he could not have been ordained. Bale possessed copies of works by him on the history of the Carmelites. Bale ascribes to him also an Elucidarium Fidei, which occurs in many manuscripts, and has been printed as the work of Anselm. It has been also ascribed to Honorius of Autun, Guibert Novigentinus, and even Augustine. Bale ascribes to William Carmina Diversa.

See also 

 Whitefriars, Coventry

References

Sources 

 

Attribution:

Further reading 

 Bale, John (1557–1559). Scriptorvm illustriũ Maioris Brytannie̜ … Catalogus. Basel: Ioannem Oporinum. pp. 461–462.
 Staring, Adrianus (1989). Medieval Carmelite Heritage. Rome: Institutum Carmelitanum. pp. 182, 267. 
 Villiers, C. de S. E. de (1752). Bibliotheca Carmelitana. Vol. 1. Orléans: M. Couret de Villeneuve & Joannes Rouzeau. pp. 596–597.

14th-century deaths
14th-century English writers
Carmelites